Lutetium is a chemical element with the symbol Lu and atomic number 71. It is a silvery white metal, which resists corrosion in dry air, but not in moist air. Lutetium is the last element in the lanthanide series, and it is traditionally counted among the rare earth elements; it can also be classified as the first element of the 6th-period transition metals.

Lutetium was independently discovered in 1907 by French scientist Georges Urbain, Austrian mineralogist Baron Carl Auer von Welsbach, and American chemist Charles James. All of these researchers found lutetium as an impurity in the mineral ytterbia, which was previously thought to consist entirely of ytterbium. The dispute on the priority of the discovery occurred shortly after, with Urbain and Welsbach accusing each other of publishing results influenced by the published research of the other; the naming honor went to Urbain, as he had published his results earlier. He chose the name lutecium for the new element, but in 1949 the spelling was changed to lutetium. In 1909, the priority was finally granted to Urbain and his names were adopted as official ones; however, the name cassiopeium (or later cassiopium) for element 71 proposed by Welsbach was used by many German scientists until the 1950s.

Lutetium is not a particularly abundant element, although it is significantly more common than silver in the earth's crust. It has few specific uses. Lutetium-176 is a relatively abundant (2.5%) radioactive isotope with a half-life of about 38 billion years, used to determine the age of minerals and meteorites. Lutetium usually occurs in association with the element yttrium and is sometimes used in metal alloys and as a catalyst in various chemical reactions. 177Lu-DOTA-TATE is used for radionuclide therapy (see Nuclear medicine) on neuroendocrine tumours. Lutetium has the highest Brinell hardness of any lanthanide, at 890–1300 MPa.

Characteristics

Physical properties
A lutetium atom has 71 electrons, arranged in the configuration [Xe] 4f145d16s2. When entering a chemical reaction, the atom loses its two outermost electrons and the single 5d-electron. The lutetium atom is the smallest among the lanthanide atoms, due to the lanthanide contraction, and as a result lutetium has the highest density, melting point, and hardness of the lanthanides. It is the only lanthanide that cannot use the 4f orbitals for chemistry; thus it is a d-block rather than an f-block element, and on this basis some consider it not to be a lanthanide at all, but a transition metal like its lighter congeners scandium and yttrium.

Chemical properties and compounds

Lutetium's compounds always contain the element in the oxidation state +3. Aqueous solutions of most lutetium salts are colorless and form white crystalline solids upon drying, with the common exception of the iodide. The soluble salts, such as nitrate, sulfate and acetate form hydrates upon crystallization. The oxide, hydroxide, fluoride, carbonate, phosphate and oxalate are insoluble in water.

Lutetium metal is slightly unstable in air at standard conditions, but it burns readily at 150 °C to form lutetium oxide. The resulting compound is known to absorb water and carbon dioxide, and it may be used to remove vapors of these compounds from closed atmospheres. Similar observations are made during reaction between lutetium and water (slow when cold and fast when hot); lutetium hydroxide is formed in the reaction. Lutetium metal is known to react with the four lightest halogens to form trihalides; except the fluoride they are soluble in water.

Lutetium dissolves readily in weak acids and dilute sulfuric acid to form solutions containing the colorless lutetium ions, which are coordinated by between seven and nine water molecules, the average being .

Oxidation states

Lutetium is usually found in the +3 oxidation state, like most other lanthanides. However, it can also be in the 0, +1 and +2 states as well.

Isotopes

Lutetium occurs on the Earth in form of two isotopes: lutetium-175 and lutetium-176. Out of these two, only the former is stable, making the element monoisotopic.
To date, 34 synthetic radioisotopes of the element have been characterized, ranging in mass number from 149 to 184; the most stable such isotopes are lutetium-174 with a half-life of 3.31 years, and lutetium-173 with a half-life of 1.37 years. All of the remaining radioactive isotopes have half-lives that are less than 9 days, and the majority of these have half-lives that are less than half an hour. Isotopes lighter than the stable lutetium-175 decay via electron capture (to produce isotopes of ytterbium), with some alpha and positron emission; the heavier isotopes decay primarily via beta decay, producing hafnium isotopes.

The element also has 43 nuclear isomers, with masses of 150, 151, 153–162, and 166–180 (not every mass number corresponds to only one isomer). The most stable of them are lutetium-177m, with a half-life of 160.4 days, and lutetium-174m, with a half-life of 142 days; these are longer than the half-lives of the ground states of all radioactive lutetium isotopes except lutetium-173, 174, and 176.

History
Lutetium, derived from the Latin Lutetia (Paris), was independently discovered in 1907 by French scientist Georges Urbain, Austrian mineralogist Baron Carl Auer von Welsbach, and American chemist Charles James. They found it as an impurity in ytterbia, which was thought by Swiss chemist Jean Charles Galissard de Marignac to consist entirely of ytterbium. The scientists proposed different names for the elements: Urbain chose neoytterbium and lutecium, whereas Welsbach chose aldebaranium and cassiopeium (after Aldebaran and Cassiopeia). Both of these articles accused the other man of publishing results based on those of the author.

The International Commission on Atomic Weights, which was then responsible for the attribution of new element names, settled the dispute in 1909 by granting priority to Urbain and adopting his names as official ones, based on the fact that the separation of lutetium from Marignac's ytterbium was first described by Urbain; after Urbain's names were recognized, neoytterbium was reverted to ytterbium. Until the 1950s, some German-speaking chemists called lutetium by Welsbach's name, cassiopeium; in 1949, the spelling of element 71 was changed to lutetium. The reason for this was that Welsbach's 1907 samples of lutetium had been pure, while Urbain's 1907 samples only contained traces of lutetium. This later misled Urbain into thinking that he had discovered element 72, which he named celtium, which was actually very pure lutetium. The later discrediting of Urbain's work on element 72 led to a reappraisal of Welsbach's work on element 71, so that the element was renamed to cassiopeium in German-speaking countries for some time. Charles James, who stayed out of the priority argument, worked on a much larger scale and possessed the largest supply of lutetium at the time. Pure lutetium metal was first produced in 1953.

Occurrence and production

Found with almost all other rare-earth metals but never by itself, lutetium is very difficult to separate from other elements. Its principal commercial source is as a by-product from the processing of the rare earth phosphate mineral monazite (which has concentrations of only 0.0001% of the element, not much higher than the abundance of lutetium in the Earth crust of about 0.5 mg/kg. No lutetium-dominant minerals are currently known. The main mining areas are China, United States, Brazil, India, Sri Lanka and Australia. The world production of lutetium (in the form of oxide) is about 10 tonnes per year. Pure lutetium metal is very difficult to prepare. It is one of the rarest and most expensive of the rare earth metals with the price about US$10,000 per kilogram, or about one-fourth that of gold.

Crushed minerals are treated with hot concentrated sulfuric acid to produce water-soluble sulfates of rare earths. Thorium precipitates out of solution as hydroxide and is removed. After that the solution is treated with ammonium oxalate to convert rare earths into their insoluble oxalates. The oxalates are converted to oxides by annealing. The oxides are dissolved in nitric acid that excludes one of the main components, cerium, whose oxide is insoluble in HNO3. Several rare earth metals, including lutetium, are separated as a double salt with ammonium nitrate by crystallization. Lutetium is separated by ion exchange. In this process, rare-earth ions are sorbed onto suitable ion-exchange resin by exchange with hydrogen, ammonium or cupric ions present in the resin. Lutetium salts are then selectively washed out by suitable complexing agent. Lutetium metal is then obtained by reduction of anhydrous LuCl3 or LuF3 by either an alkali metal or alkaline earth metal.

Applications
Because of production difficulty and high price, lutetium has very few commercial uses, especially since it is rarer than most of the other lanthanides but is chemically not very different. However, stable lutetium can be used as catalysts in petroleum cracking in refineries and can also be used in alkylation, hydrogenation, and polymerization applications. A nitrogen-doped lutetium hydride may have a role in creating room temperature superconductors at 10 kbar.

Lutetium aluminium garnet has been proposed for use as a lens material in high refractive index immersion lithography. Additionally, a tiny amount of lutetium is added as a dopant to gadolinium gallium garnet, which is used in magnetic bubble memory devices. Cerium-doped lutetium oxyorthosilicate is currently the preferred compound for detectors in positron emission tomography (PET). Lutetium aluminium garnet (LuAG) is used as a phosphor in light-emitting diode light bulbs.

Aside from stable lutetium, its radioactive isotopes have several specific uses. The suitable half-life and decay mode made lutetium-176 used as a pure beta emitter, using lutetium which has been exposed to neutron activation, and in lutetium–hafnium dating to date meteorites. The synthetic isotope lutetium-177 bound to octreotate (a somatostatin analogue), is used experimentally in targeted radionuclide therapy for neuroendocrine tumors. Indeed, lutetium-177 is seeing increased usage as a radionuclide in neuroendrocine tumor therapy and bone pain palliation. Research indicates that lutetium-ion atomic clocks could provide greater accuracy than any existing atomic clock.

Lutetium tantalate (LuTaO4) is the densest known stable white material (density 9.81 g/cm3) and therefore is an ideal host for X-ray phosphors. The only denser white material is thorium dioxide, with density of 10 g/cm3, but the thorium it contains is radioactive.

Precautions
Like other rare-earth metals, lutetium is regarded as having a low degree of toxicity, but its compounds should be handled with care nonetheless: for example, lutetium fluoride inhalation is dangerous and the compound irritates skin. Lutetium nitrate may be dangerous as it may explode and burn once heated. Lutetium oxide powder is toxic as well if inhaled or ingested.

Similarly to the other rare-earth metals, lutetium has no known biological role, but it is found even in humans, concentrating in bones, and to a lesser extent in the liver and kidneys. Lutetium salts are known to occur together with other lanthanide salts in nature; the element is the least abundant in the human body of all lanthanides. Human diets have not been monitored for lutetium content, so it is not known how much the average human takes in, but estimations show the amount is only about several micrograms per year, all coming from tiny amounts absorbed by plants. Soluble lutetium salts are mildly toxic, but insoluble ones are not.

See also

References

 
Chemical elements
Lanthanides
Transition metals
Chemical elements with hexagonal close-packed structure